Hazur Sahib Nanded railway station (station code: NED) is a railway station serving Nanded city in Nanded district of Maharashtra state of India. It is under the Nanded railway division of South Central Railway zone of Indian Railways. It is located on the Secunderabad–Manmad line of Indian Railways. It is classified as an A1–category station, in terms of earnings.This Station connects Nanded with other major maharashtrian and indian cities like Mumbai, Pune, Nagpur, Nashik, Aurangabad, Kolhapur, Shirdi, Pandharpur, New Delhi, Howrah, Bangalore, Amritsar, Chandigarh, Vishakhapatnam, Jaipur, Vijaywada, Ahmedabad, Surat, Patna, Sri Ganganagar.

The station is located at 36 m above sea level and has four platforms. , 89 passenger trains halt each day at this station.

In 2008, the station was named after Hazur Sahib, a takht of Sikhism which is situated here.

History
The Hyderabad-Godavari Valley Railway was a  gauge railway. John Wallace Pringle — who had recently completed surveying routes for the Uganda railway — was appointed as the superintending engineer in 1900. The railway opened in 1900 with a  line from Hyderabad city to Manmad Junction.

Gauge conversion to  broad gauge was completed between Manmad–Nanded/Mudhkhed in 1995. The patch between Mudkhed–Secunderabad remained metre-gauge till it was finally converted by 2003.

Trains Originating & Terminating at Hazur Sahib Nanded railway station
12715 Hazur Sahib Nanded-Amritsar Sachkhand Express (via Aurangabad, New Delhi)

12730 Hazur Sahib Nanded-Hadapsar (Pune) SF Express (via Manmad, Ahmednagar)

12421 Nanded-Amritsar Weekly Superfast Express (via Akola, Khandwa, New Delhi)

12753 Hazur Sahib Nanded-H.Nizamuddin Marathwada Sampark Kranti Express (via Aurangabad, Bhopal)

12767 Hazur Sahib Nanded-Santragachi Superfast Express (via Nagpur, Bilaspur)

17620 Hazur Sahib Nanded-Aurangabad Weekly Express (via Parbhani, Jalna)

16593 Hazur Sahib Nanded-Bangalore City Express (via Parbhani, Vikarabad)

12751 Hazur Sahib Nanded-Jammu Tawi Humsafar Express (via Khandwa, New Delhi)

12439 Hazur Sahib Nanded-Shri Ganganagar Superfast Express (via New Delhi, Hanumangarh)

17623 Hazur Sahib Nanded-Shri Ganganagar Express (via Ahmedabad, Bikaner)

12485 Hazur Sahib Nanded-Shri Ganganagar Express (via New Delhi, Bathinda)

17410 Hazur Sahib Nanded-Adilabad Express (via Mudkhed, Bhokar)

17664 Hazur Sahib Nanded-Tandur Express (via Nizamabad, Secunderabad)

22709 Hazur Sahib Nanded-Amb Andaura Weekly Express

17614 Hazur Sahib Nanded-Panvel Express (via Parbhani, Latur, Pune)

20812 Hazur Sahib Nanded-Vishakhapatnam Superfast Express (via Secunderabad, Vijaywada)

20810 Hazur Sahib Nanded-Sambalpur Nagavali Express (via Secunderabad, Vishakhapatnam)

17618 Hazur Sahib Nanded-Mumbai CSMT Tapovan Express (via Manmad, Kalyan)

07777 Hazur Sahib Nanded-Manmad Special DEMU (via Parbhani, Aurangabad)

Same trains terminate in reverse

But Tandur express don't terminate here and got further till parbhani jn.

Amenities
Amenities at station include: lifts, escalators, computerized reservation office, waiting room, retiring room, vegetarian and non-vegetarian refreshments, and a book stall.There is a passenger coach care depot here as well as a railway hospital

Gallery

See also
 Maltekdi railway station, another railway station serving Nanded.
 List of railway stations in India

References

External links
  India Rail Info

Railway stations in Nanded district
Transport in Nanded